Suleiman Khan was a Chobanid puppet for the throne of the Ilkhanate during the breakdown of central authority in Persia.

Life 
His birth name was Ilyas and descended from the great-grandson of the Ilkhan Hülegü's third son Yoshmut. Like Jalayirid puppet Jahan Temür, his ancestors were fallen out of favor in Ilkhanate. Yoshmut lost a qurultai to Abaqa in 1265 and died on 18 Jul 1271. Yoshmut's son and Ilyas' grandfather Sogai were executed for treason against Arghun in 1289.

Ilyas was raised to the throne around May 1339 by the Chobanid Hasan Kucek and was given title Suleiman Khan. He then married Sati Beg, who had previously been Hasan Kucek's puppet Ilkhan despite being very younger than her. Suleiman was present at the battle on the Jaghatu against the Jalayirids under Hasan Buzurg in June 1340; the Chobanids emerged victorious. Around 1341 the Sarbadars, in an attempt to foster an alliance with the Chobanids, accepted Hasan Kucek as their suzerain, and also recognized Suleiman as Ilkhan. He lost a battle against Eretna near Sivas later.

In 1343 Hasan Kucek was murdered and a rivalry broke out for the succession between Sati Beg's son Surgan, Yagi Basti and Malek Asraf. When Malek Asraf defeated Surgan and accused Suleiman of murdering Hasan. Suleiman amassed a part of Hasan Kucek's treasury as well, which led to Surgan, Sati Beg and Suleiman concluding an alliance. Suleiman appealed to Hasan Buzurg to intervene, who escorted him to Tabriz. Malek Ashraf raised another puppet named Anushirwan as new Ilkhan and rode to Tabriz. Hasan Buzurg meanwhile withdrew his support from Suleiman. They fled to Diyarbakr, where Hajji Taghay's nephew Ibrahimshah; where his coins representing Suleiman were struck until 1345.

References

Sources 

Charles Melville and 'Abbas Zaryab. "Chobanids." Encyclopedia Iranica.

Il-Khan emperors
14th-century monarchs in Asia